The Traveller's Baggage (Portuguese: A Bagagem do Viajante) is a volume of newspaper articles by Nobel Prize-winning author José Saramago. It was first published in 1973.

Novels by José Saramago
1973 books
20th-century Portuguese literature
Portuguese-language novels